Estimates of the total number of deaths in the Syrian Civil War, by opposition activist groups, vary between 503,064 and about 613,407 as of March 2023. In late September 2021, the United Nations stated it had documented the deaths of at least 350,209 people in the conflict between March 2011 and March 2021, but cautioned the figure was "certainly an under-count". 

The most violent year of the conflict was 2015, when around 110,000 people were killed. Half of the war's victims died between 2013-2015. By mid-March 2022, opposition activist group the Syrian Observatory for Human Rights (SOHR) reported the number of children killed in the conflict had risen to 25,286, and that 15,237 women had also been killed. 

On 28 June 2022, the United Nations Human Rights Office (OHCHR) said that 306,887 civilians had been killed in Syria during the conflict between March 2011 and March 2021, representing about 1.5% of its pre-war population. This figure did not include indirect and non-civilian deaths. As of December 2022, according to the GCR2P NGO, a minimum of 580,000 people is estimated to have been killed; with 13 million Syrians being displaced and 6.7 million refugees forced to flee Syria. Government forces reportedly arrested and tortured numerous repatriated refugees, subjecting them to forced disappearances and extrajudicial executions.

As of February 2015, the UNHCR designated the conflict as the "world's worst humanitarian crisis", while the head of the UNHRC's commission for Syria stated the Syrian government was responsible for the majority of civilian casualties up to that point. The pro-opposition Syrian Network for Human Rights estimated the Syrian government and its foreign allies were responsible for 91% of the total civilian casualties. Additionally, according to the SOHR, 87% of all civilian deaths it had documented were caused by government or pro-government forces.

Overall deaths

At the start of the war, Al Jazeera journalist Nir Rosen stated that many of the deaths reported daily by activists were in fact armed insurgents falsely presented as civilian deaths, but said that real civilian deaths do occur on a regular basis. Several Middle East analysts, including Sharmine Narwani from the Lebanese Al Akhbar newspaper and the UAE/Saudi Al Arabiya website, also urged caution.

This was later confirmed when in late May 2012, Rami Abdulrahman of the Syrian Observatory for Human Rights, which is one of the opposition-affiliated groups counting the number of those killed in the uprising, stated that civilians who had taken up arms during the earliest days of the conflict were being counted under the category of "civilians" as they were not army nor army defectors.

In May 2013, SOHR stated that at least 41,000 of those killed during the conflict were Alawites. By April 2015, reportedly a third of the country's 250,000 Alawites that were of fighting age had been killed. In April 2017, a pro-opposition source claimed 150,000 young Alawites had died.

All of the following totals include civilians, rebels and government forces:

Death tolls by time periods
The following figures were all compiled by the SOHR which is considered an authoritative source on the matter. The figures are only for documented deaths, while the SOHR estimates another 110,600 undocumented deaths had occurred.

Death tolls by provinces
According to the Syrian opposition website Syrian Martyrs, the conflict's death toll was 151,888 up to 30 April 2016, which was the time of its last update. The number includes 35,859 rebel combatants but does not include members of the government security forces or pro-government foreign combatants who have died. Early in the conflict, the Syrian Martyrs number of civilian deaths was significantly higher than the ones presented by other organisations, including the UN; among the reasons are that they recorded deaths even when no name is given for the reportedly killed individual and that they collated reports of deaths from more sources.

Civilian deaths

According to the pro-opposition Syrian Network for Human Rights, 227,413 civilians had been killed between March 2011 and June 2022.

According to the pro-opposition Syrian Observatory for Human Rights, 162,390 civilians had been killed between March 2011 and March 2023. This number does not include an estimated 55,000 civilians killed in government prisons.

According to the Violations Documentation Center in Syria, 131,750 civilians had been killed until June 2020.

According to the Statista Research Department, almost 207,000 civilians had been killed by November 2020, including about 25,000 children.

Combatant deaths

Government forces

The non-Syrian militiamen fatalities figure includes: over 2,000 Afghans, at least 1,308 Iraqi Shia militiamen, 561–620 Iranians, 158 Pakistanis, one Lebanese member of the SCNP, one member of the Lebanese Amal Movement and a Saudi Shiite fighter. Other sources put the overall number of killed Iranian-lead forces, which also includes the Afghan and Pakistani militias, at between 2,500 and 3,500 by the end of August 2017. Also, 1,858 Palestinian militiamen have been killed, according to the PFLP–GC, and these include: 1,100 Liwa Al-Quds fighters, 400 PFLP–GC members, 285 members of the PLA, 42 who belonged to Fatah al-Intifada, 11 PPSF members, 10 Al Saeka Brigade fighters and 10 Free Palestine Movement members. Additionally, the Action Group For Palestinians of Syria reported 21 Galilee Forces fighters had been killed and put the number of dead Free Palestine Movement members higher at 24. 17 PLA soldiers were also missing.

Except one death (August 2011), all of the Hezbollah fatalities have occurred since September 2012.

Between October 2015 and December 2017, it was reported that 150–200 Russian security contractors had been killed. According to the Syrian Observatory for Human Rights, 266 Russian mercenaries were killed until mid-March 2023, whom it includes in the death toll of other non-Syrian fighters.

In addition, 1,000 civilian government officials were also killed by November 2012.

Anti-government forces
Due to the main opposition monitor SOHR's policy early in the conflict of counting rebel fighters that were not defectors as civilians, a comprehensive number of rebels killed in the conflict, thus far, has not been ascertained. In late November 2012, SOHR estimated that at least 10,000 rebels had been killed, but noted the possibility of the figure being higher because the rebels, like the government, were lying about how many of their forces had died to make it look like they were winning. In March 2013, SOHR stated that the actual number of killed rebels and government forces could be double the number they were already able to document.

There have been 72,272 foreign rebel, ISIL and SDF fighters, at least 455 anti-government suicide bombers and 246 rebel child soldiers that have been killed in the conflict. 936 of the killed foreigners were in the SDF, mostly Kurds from parts of Kurdistan outside Syrian Kurdistan. More than 3,200 members of the Kurdistan Workers' Party (PKK) also died while fighting alongside the SDF.

Foreigners killed

Foreign civilians killed

Foreign anti-government fighters killed
70,008 foreign anti-government fighters have been killed by mid-March 2022, according to the SOHR.

9,936 foreign opposition fighters were killed by late December 2013, according to the Jihadist Salafist Movement in Jordan, with the nationalities being as follows: 1,902 Tunisians, 1,807 Libyans, 1,432 Iraqis, 828 Lebanese, 821 Egyptians, 800 Palestinians, 714 Saudis, 571 Yemenis, 412 Moroccans, 274 Algerians, 202 Jordanians, 91 Omanis, 71 Kuwaitis, 42 Somalis, 30 Albanians and Caucasians, 21 Bahrainis, 9 Emiratis, 8 Qataris, 3 Sudanese and 1 Mauritanian. The London-based European Centre for Syria Research put the number of Saudis killed even higher at 729 a month earlier in November 2013, out of 6,113 foreign fighters reported killed by then. The jihadist movement updated the number of Jordanians killed by late May 2014 to 342, although they put the figure in late October at over 250. According to another estimate, the Jordanian toll was at least 500 by July 2016.

According to Abu Omar al-Shishani, the Chechen ISIL commander, 500 militants from the Caucasus had been killed by mid-January 2014 since the start of the war. Ramzan Kadyrov, Head of the Chechen Republic, stated in mid-November 2015, that 200 Chechens had died.

According to a report by a Syrian military research center, as of September 2014: 3,872 Saudi, 3,691 Chechen and 2,904 Lebanese fighters had been killed. Another 2,689 Saudi fighters were missing.

In mid-May 2015, at least 70 Lebanese fighters were reported killed in the previous several months. In late December 2015, Tunis stated 800 Tunisian ISIL fighters had been killed since the start of the war.

The nationalities of some others are as follows: 2,960 Russians, 403–453 Frenchmen, 400 Turks, 300 Azerbaijanis, 300 Tajiks, 220–380 Germans, 183 Britons, 168 Albanians, 150 Belgians, 150 Kyrgyz, 95 Australians, 88 Bosniaks, 84 Indonesians, 75 Danes, 51 Americans, 50 Swedes, 43 Georgians, 39 Dutch, 37 Italians, 36 Malaysians, 31 Norwegians, 23 Austrians, 23 Canadians, 15–20 Finns, 16 Indians, 13 Afghans, 5 Iranians, 4 Irishmen, 4 Israeli-Arabs, 4 Maldivians, 3 Chinese, 3 Pakistanis, 2–3 Filipinos, 2 Eritreans, 2 Mauritanians, 2 South Africans, 2 Spaniards, 2 Uzbeks, 1 Armenian, 1 Bangladeshi, 1 Bulgarian, 1 Chadian, 1 Japanese, 1 Kazakh, 1 Romanian and 1 Slovenian.

Foreign soldiers killed

531–611 foreign soldiers have been killed during the conflict, mostly by military involvement from their countries and in the border areas with Syria.

 16 servicemen killedOn 2 March 2013, one Iraqi soldier was killed during clashes between Syrian rebels and government forces at a Syrian-Iraqi border crossing. On 4 March 2013, 13 Iraqi soldiers were killed by unknown gunmen near the border with Syria while they were transporting 65 Syrian soldiers and government officials back to their country after they had retreated to Iraq a few days earlier. 48 of the Syrians were also killed in the attack. On 9 June 2013, Syrian rebels attacked a southern Iraqi border post, killing one Iraqi guard and wounding two. On 14 July 2013, another attack by fighters from the Syrian side of the border left one Iraqi policeman dead and five others wounded.

 8 servicemen killed A Jordanian soldier was killed in clashes with armed militants who were attempting to cross the border from Jordan into Syria on 22 October 2012. On 3 January 2015, ISIL burned a Jordanian military pilot alive in a metal cage. The pilot was captured after his airplane crashed near Raqqa while conducting air-strikes. Six Jordanian soldiers were killed by a car-bomb blast near the Syrian refugee camp of al-Rukban on 21 June 2016.

 60 servicemen killed On 1 February 2013, two Lebanese soldiers were killed, along with 1-2 militants, and six were wounded in clashes near the Syrian border which started after an attempt by the military to arrest an anti-Assad rebel commander, who was also killed. On 28 May 2013, three Lebanese soldiers were killed in an attack on their checkpoint near the border town of Arsal by unknown militants who then fled over the border into Syria. On 29 March 2014, three soldiers were killed and four wounded in a suicide bomb attack on their checkpoint near Arsal. 20 soldiers were killed during the Battle of Arsal against Syrian and other foreign jihadists and a further 13 were captured and subsequently executed. On 19 September, two soldiers were killed by a roadside bomb near Arsal. On 2 December, six soldiers were killed and one wounded in an ambush by unknown gunmen in the Tal Hamra area of Ras Baalbek, near the border with Syria. On 23 January 2015, eight soldiers were killed and 22 wounded near Ras Baalbek after their outpost near the border was attacked by ISIL. The fighting also left more than 40 militants dead. Three soldiers were also killed during an offensive against ISIL in the border area in August 2017.

 139–162 servicemen killed

Following the start of Russia's intervention in Syria against rebel and ISIL forces at the end of September 2015, 116 soldiers had died by 23 February 2019. Among them, was a Russian military co-pilot who was killed when his Su-24 military plane was shot down near the Turkish-Syrian border by the Turkish military on 24 November 2015. His pilot was later recovered alive and well by Russian and Syrian special forces. Additionally, a Russian marine was killed when his military rescue helicopter was shot down by rebels while searching for the downed plane's pilots. Almost half of the deaths were attributed to the crash of an An-26 on approach to Khmeimim air base in Latakia, and the accidental shooting down of a reconnaissance plane by Syrian air-defenses. Between 15 and 18 January 2020, 4 Russian soldiers were killed by jihadist groups in the eastern countryside of Idlib. On 18 August 2020, Maj. Gen. Vyacheslav Gladkikh was killed by an improvised explosive device planted on a side road near Deir ez-Zor. Two soldiers were killed in 2021, in improvised explosive device attacks on their patrols.

 294–351 servicemen killed

Two members of the Turkish Air Force were killed when their F-4 Phantom II military jet was shot down near the Turkish-Syrian border by the Syrian Army on 22 June 2012. On 2 May 2013, one Turkish border guard policeman was killed in a clash with smugglers or rebel fighters on the border between Turkey and Syria. According to the opposition, two rebels were killed as well. Throughout 2014, seven soldiers and a policeman were killed along the border with Syria in shootouts with foreign jihadists, Kurdish fighters and other unknown gunmen. On 22 February 2015, a soldier was killed in an accident during a military incursion into Syria to evacuate Turkish troops at the Tomb of Suleyman Shah. Later, in two incidents in July and September, two soldiers were killed and five wounded by cross-border fire from ISIL territory in Syria. On 15 February 2016, a soldier died at the border during clashes against human smugglers that tried to cross the border illegally. Two Turkish soldiers died in a suicide bombing at a Syrian border crossing in mid-August.

Following the start of Turkey's ground incursion into Syria against ISIL and Kurdish forces in late August 2016, 72 soldiers had died by 29 March 2017. 61–96 more died as result of Turkey's second large incursion between 2018 and 2019, and 79–93 were killed in Idlib during the Turkish military operation that began in February 2018. Another 16 Turkish soldiers died during Turkey's third incursion in clashes against the SDF. 25 more soldiers also died in 2019 and 2023, in the areas of Operation Euphrates Shield and Operation Olive Branch while 27–35 soldiers died in the area of Operation Peace Spring between January 2020 and January 2022. On September 19, 2022, a Turkish soldier was killed on the Turkish-Syrian border eastern of Kobani.

According to the Syrian Observatory for Human Rights, 251 Turkish soldiers died in Syria by 15 March 2023.

 1 serviceman killed  The Élysée Palace announced in September 2017 that a French servicemen of the 13th regiment of paratroopers died in the Levant region during Operation Chammal. It was not known where the precise location of the soldier's death.

 1 serviceman killed A British soldier, named as Sgt Matt Tunroe of the 3rd Battalion the Parachute Regiment died on 30 March 2018 in Manbij. This was initially reported as an IED explosion from which a U.S. soldier had also been killed from. However, the Ministry of Defence later clarified it was a case of friendly fire, caused by the accidental detonation of explosives carried by another coalition soldier.

 10 servicemen killed A U.S. pilot was killed on 30 November 2014, when his F-16 fighter aircraft crashed in Jordan. Also, a U.S. special forces member died due to a IED explosion. Two other service members died due to non-combat causes in northern Syria in 2017. A US serviceman died on 30 March 2018 by an IED explosion in Manbij. Four Americans, including two soldiers, were killed by a bombing in Manbij city on 16 January 2019. One American soldier was killed on 28 April 2019, possibly due to Turkish shelling. Another US soldier died in Syria on January 24, 2020, following a rollover crash in Deir ez-Zor province. On 22 July 2020, a US serviceman died in a mishap involving a vehicle overturn in Al-Hasakah.

Foreign air-strike casualties
The SOHR considers the following figures on ISIL, al-Nusra and other rebel fatalities to be higher due to the groups' efforts to hide their losses.

American-led intervention

According to the SOHR, U.S.-led Coalition airstrikes have killed 12,865 people across Syria, of which: 9,176 dead were ISIL fighters, 374 Al-Nusra Front militants and other rebels, 169 government soldiers and 2,676 civilians. The air strikes occurred in the period between 23 September 2014 and 15 March 2022.

Russian intervention
According to the SOHR, Russian airstrikes in Syria killed 20,697 people, of whom 6,201 were ISIL fighters, 6,225 militants from the Al-Qaeda affiliate al-Nusra Front and other rebel forces, 8,697 civilians and at least five Turkish soldiers. The air strikes occurred in the period between 30 September 2015 and 31 January 2023. The New York Times accused the Russian air force of specifically focusing on attacking civilian hospitals and other medical facilities, including hospitals on so-called "deconfliction list".

According to Airwars, a not-for-profit transparency project aimed both at tracking and archiving international military actions in conflict zones such as Iraq, Syria and Libya, Russian airstrikes have killed 4,311–6,395 civilians

According to the Russian Defense Ministry, since the start of Russia's aerial campaign in Syria and by 20 October 2018, the Russian Air Force killed more than 87,500 rebels and ISIL fighters.

Israeli intervention
According to the SOHR, more than 500 people were killed during Israeli air attacks in Syria between January 2018 and September 2020, including: 228 Hezbollah and other pro-Iranian militiamen, 171 Iranian soldiers, 98 Syrian government fighters and 13 civilians were killed by Israel Armed Forces.

According to the SOHR, 119 people were killed during Israeli air attacks in Syria between January and November 3, 2021, including: 38 Syrian soldiers and militiamen, 24 Iraqi militiamen, 17 Afghan militiamen, five Pakistani militiamen, 21 other pro-Iranian foreign militiamen and five civilians.

According to the SOHR, 90 people were killed during Israeli air attacks in Syria between January and December 2022, including: 36 military officers and members of the military's air defences, 11 Iranian-backed Syrian militiamen, 29 Iranian-backed non-Syrian militiamen, 11 Syrian and non-Syrian militiamen working for the Lebanese Hezbollah and one civilian.

Medical workers killed

A February 2015 joint report by the Center for Public Health and Human Rights of the Johns Hopkins Bloomberg School of Public Health and the Syrian American Medical Society asserted that "Syria is the most dangerous place in the world to be a doctor". Roughly half (an estimated 15,000) of Syrian doctors fled the country. The government passed a law in 2012 making it illegal to render medical aid to anyone suspected to be an opposition member and Amnesty International found that doctors and medical staff also took part in torture of patients.

Physicians for Human Rights has been tracking the medical personnel deaths in Syria, though they state that "these numbers are conservative given the difficulties in reporting during a war." As of the end of September 2015, the number of medical workers killed in the Syrian civil war totaled 679. In March 2017, the number of killed medical personnel was updated to more than 800. 723 of these deaths were attributable to the Syrian government, while 72 were killed by ISIL or rebel groups, one by Kurdish forces, and 13 by unidentified forces. Towards the end of May 2020, the SNHR put the death toll at 855 medical personnel, of which 669 were killed by government forces, 68 by the Russian military, 40 by ISIL, and 36 by the rebels.

Médecins Sans Frontières has reported that suppliers in Syria refuse to sell essential medical supplies such as gauze and surgical threads to doctors due to government intimidation, with this being a particular problem for besieged areas.

See also
Casualties of the Iraq War
Casualty recording

Notes

References

Syrian civil war
Syrian civil war